Scott Francis O'Grady (born October 12, 1965) is a former United States Air Force fighter pilot. On June 2, 1995, he was shot down over Bosnia and Herzegovina by a 2K12 Kub mobile SAM launcher and forced to eject from his F-16C into hostile territory. US Marines from heavy-helicopter squadron HMH-464 and the 24 MEU(SOC)  eventually rescued O'Grady after nearly a week of his evading the Bosnian Serbs. He was previously involved in the Banja Luka incident where he fired upon six enemy aircraft. The 2001 film Behind Enemy Lines is loosely based upon his experiences.

In September 2011, O'Grady announced a run for the 2012 Republican nomination for Texas State Senate District 8, held at the time by the retiring Republican Florence Shapiro, but he later suspended his campaign because of uncertainties over the Texas redistricting fight. In November 2020, President Donald Trump stated an official intention to nominate O'Grady as the next Assistant Secretary of Defense for International Security Affairs. The nomination was submitted to the Senate for confirmation on November 30, 2020.

Career

NATO: Operation Deny Flight 

The Bosnian War was an international armed conflict that took place in Bosnia and Herzegovina between April 1992 and December 1995. The North Atlantic Treaty Organization (NATO), had decided to intervene in the Bosnian War after allegations of war crimes against civilians were made by various media organizations. NATO military involvement primarily involved enforcement of a No-fly zone codenamed Operation Deny Flight to discourage Bosnian Serb military aircraft from attacking Bosnian government and Bosnian Croat forces. As part of that operation, two F-16s from the 555th Fighter Squadron based at Aviano Air Base, Italy, were patrolling the skies above Bosnia on June 2, 1995.

Shootdown 
On the ground, a Bosnian Serb army 2K12 Kub surface-to-air missile battery near Mrkonjić Grad was readying to fire its missiles on NATO aircraft. The Serbs had moved the mobile-tracked missile battery and laid a trap. They switched on their missile radars intermittently, giving F-16 fighters little warning. Waiting until a plane was directly overhead, where the aircraft's warning and countermeasures would be at their weakest, they fired two missiles. In the cockpit, O'Grady's instruments alerted him that a missile was coming, but, because he was flying through an overcast sky, he could not see it. The first missile exploded between the two aircraft. The second struck the F-16 piloted by O'Grady. His flight lead, Captain Robert Gordon "Wilbur" Wright, saw O'Grady's plane burst into flames and break in two. Wright did not see a parachute, but O'Grady survived by ejecting from the aircraft.

O'Grady landed among a Bosnian Serb population that he was briefed would be unfriendly. He quickly secured a  survival bag, ran, and hid. Rubbing dirt on his face, he hid face-down as Bosnian Serb forces came upon his parachute, half a dozen times shooting their rifles only feet from where he was hidden in an effort to flush him out or kill him.

During the next six days, he put to use the lessons learned during a 17-day Survival, Evasion, Resistance and Escape (SERE) training session he had undertaken near his hometown of Spokane, Washington. He ate leaves, grass, and bugs, and stored the little rainwater he could collect with a sponge in plastic bags.

O'Grady radioed for help immediately but had to remain quiet with paramilitaries coming within feet of him; he used the radio following standard operating procedures as the U.S. Air Force had taught him so as not to give away his position to unfriendly forces. On his 6th night on the ground he made radio contact, signalling his location using his radio's limited battery power. NATO planes conducting sorties in the Balkans had been picking up beeper snippets that they thought could be coming from O'Grady. This extremely sensitive information was inadvertently revealed by General Ronald Fogleman, the Air Force Chief of Staff, when the general told reporters attending a promotion ceremony that monitors had detected "intermittent" transmissions. A NATO official was quoted as saying "I was dumbfounded he said that... I mean, why not just announce to the bad guys, 'We think he's alive and kicking, and we hope we find him before you do'?"

Rescue 
Just after midnight on June 8, O'Grady spoke into the radio. An F-16 pilot, Captain Thomas "T.O." Hanford, from the 510th responded and, after confirming his identity, the rescue was set in motion. At 0440 local time, USAF Lt. General Michael Ryan and Navy Admiral Leighton Smith, commander of NATO Southern Forces, called US Marine Corps Colonel Martin Berndt aboard USS Kearsarge with orders to "execute".

Two CH-53 Sea Stallions with 51 marines from the 3rd Battalion, 8th Marines within the 24th Marine Expeditionary Unit lifted off USS Kearsarge to rescue the pilot. The two helicopters were accompanied by two Marine Corps AH-1W Supercobra helicopter gunships and a pair of Marine Corps AV-8B Harrier jump jets, one piloted by Captain Ronald C. Walkerwicz. These six aircraft had support from identical sets of replacement helicopters and jump jets as well as two Navy EA-6B Prowler electronic warfare planes, two Air Force EF-111A Raven electronic warfare planes, two Marine F/A-18D Hornets, a pair of anti-tank Air Force A-10 Thunderbolts, an SH-60B from USS Ticonderoga (CG-47), and an RAF AWACS E-3D.

At 0635, the helicopters approached the area where O'Grady's signal beacon had been traced. The pilots saw bright yellow smoke coming from trees near a rocky pasture where O'Grady had set off a flare. The first Sea Stallion, commanded by Major William Tarbutton, touched down and 20 Marines jumped off the aircraft and set up a defensive perimeter. As the second Sea Stallion, commanded by Captains Paul Fortunato and James Wright, landed, a figure with a pistol who turned out to be the missing pilot appeared running towards the Marines and immediately went to the Sea Stallion. As the side door opened, he was pulled in before the second 20 Marines poised to leave by the rear ramp could even move. They were called back to their seats, and those who had formed the defensive perimeter reboarded the other helicopter. After a quick head count, the Stallions took off. They had been on the ground no more than seven minutes.

Return 
The Marines, with O'Grady, flew low over Serb-held Bosnia. However, American aircraft detected a Serb missile radar along the Croatian coast, scanning for targets. An American plane recommended destroying the Serb radar, code-named Giraffe. The request was denied, partly out of concern that a strike could spark wider conflict.

Minutes later, the Marines reported they were under fire. Serb small arms pocked both helicopters; the Marines aboard heard the bullets hit inside the fuselage. One door gunner returned fire. One round hit some communication gear in the chopper and the bullet ended up against Sergeant Major Angel Castro Jr.'s armor without injuring anyone. At 0715 local time, 30 minutes after picking up O'Grady, the rescuers reported "feet wet", meaning they were over water. O'Grady was back aboard the Kearsarge at 0730. All of the aircraft landed without further incident.

Aftermath 
On August 11, 1995, a USAF RQ-1 Predator drone was shot down by Serb forces in the same area. The Serbs recovered the wreckage and handed it over to Russia for technical evaluation. On August 30, NATO launched Operation Deliberate Force, a massive airstrike campaign which eventually lifted the siege of Sarajevo and led to the end of the war in Bosnia.

O'Grady received a Bronze Star and Purple Heart for this mission.

Nomination: Assistant Secretary of Defense for International Security Affairs 
In November 2020, President Donald Trump announced his intent to nominate O'Grady to be an Assistant Secretary of Defense (International Security Affairs). The President justified this intent to appoint by citing O'Grady's combat experience, his book Return With Honor, and Master's degree in Theology from Dallas Theological Seminary and Honorary Doctorate of Public Service from the University of Portland in Oregon.

On January 3, 2021, his nomination was returned to the President under Rule XXXI, Paragraph 6 of the United States Senate.

Defense Policy Board
On December 14, 2020 the Department of Defence announced that the Trump administration nominated O'Grady to the Defense Policy Board, as a part of a slate of replacement nominations for the 11 board members who were abruptly fired in November 2020. O'Grady was sworn in as the board member on January 19, 2021, the last full day of Trump's presidency, under pressure from the White House to complete his and other similar nominations. Following the election of President Joe Biden, Defense Secretary Lloyd Austin ordered a "zero-based review" of all the Pentagon advisory boards and fired all of the members appointed by the DoD, including all the Defense Policy Board members, effective February 16, 2021.

Personal life 
O'Grady was born in Brooklyn, New York City, a son of William P. O'Grady and Mary Lou Scardapane, and graduated from Lewis and Clark High School in Spokane, Washington. He is a former cadet in the Civil Air Patrol and a 1989 Air Force ROTC graduate from Embry-Riddle Aeronautical University's campus in Prescott, Arizona. After his rescue, O'Grady transferred from active duty in the regular U.S. Air Force to the Air Force Reserve, where he continued to fly the F-16. In May 2007, he completed a master's degree in biblical studies at Dallas Theological Seminary in Dallas, Texas. He resides in Frisco in Collin County, Texas.

O'Grady is an active Republican, having spoken at the 1996 Republican convention in support of Bob Dole. In 2004, O'Grady, supporting George W. Bush for re-election, accused Bush's opponent John Kerry of "treason" for actions taken during the Vietnam War. O'Grady endorsed Brian Birdwell in his successful 2010 bid for the Texas State Senate, then launched his own candidacy for the Texas state house in September 2011, seeking the 2012 Republican nomination in Senate District 8 following the retirement of Sen. Florence Shapiro. O'Grady dropped out of the race in early 2012, claiming Shapiro had reneged on a promise to support him in the Republican primary, while his opponent had numerous endorsements.

In popular culture 
The shootdown incident was depicted and described on the documentary television program Situation Critical in episode No. 5, "Downed Pilot". This has been shown on the National Geographic Channel. It was also covered in "Escape! – Escape From Bosnia: The Scott O'Grady Story" on the History Channel. The BBC also made a documentary, titled "Missing in Action", that was later purchased by 20th Century Fox and Discovery Communications.

The 2001 film Behind Enemy Lines, starring Gene Hackman and Owen Wilson, is loosely based on this event. Although O'Grady had given the film a positive rating on the film review television show Hot Or Not, O'Grady took offense at the portrayal of 'his' character in Behind Enemy Lines "as a pilot who disobeys orders and swears". O'Grady sued 20th Century Fox in 2002 for falsely misleading the public that the film was true to life and for using him unauthorized to promote the film without his permission. He also took action over the documentary, Behind Enemy Lines: The Scott O'Grady Story, which was a re-edited version of a BBC documentary which Discovery Communications, parent company of the Discovery Channel, had purchased and edited. The documentary was broadcast several times on the Discovery Channel, and O'Grady accused Fox of using it to promote the film. Both suits were settled in 2004. Fox made a confidential settlement with O'Grady, while a Texas court ruled against O'Grady and in favor of Discovery Communications. The judge's ruling stated, in effect, that the events in a person's life are not the same thing as that person's likeness or image.

O'Grady co-wrote two books, collaborating on one, with Michael French, that detailed his experiences of being shot down over Bosnia and his eventual rescue, Basher Five-Two: The True Story of F-16 Fighter Pilot Captain Scott O'Grady. He first wrote a book that was a New York Times Bestseller about his experience in Return with Honor with Jeff Coplon. Another book has also been written; this one, "Good To Go:" The Rescue of Capt. Scott O'Grady, USAF, from Bosnia, was written by Mary Pat Kelly.

Bibliography

References

External links 

1965 births
Embry–Riddle Aeronautical University alumni
Living people
Military personnel from Spokane, Washington
Military personnel from Dallas
NATO personnel in the Bosnian War
Shot-down aviators
United States Air Force officers
United States Air Force reservists
Dallas Theological Seminary alumni
1995 in Bosnia and Herzegovina
Texas Republicans
American conspiracy theorists